Branching order of bacterial phyla may refer to these models:
Branching order of bacterial phyla (Woese, 1987)
Branching order of bacterial phyla (Gupta, 2001)
Branching order of bacterial phyla (Cavalier-Smith, 2002)
Branching order of bacterial phyla (Rappe and Giovanoni, 2003)
Branching order of bacterial phyla (Battistuzzi et al., 2004)
Branching order of bacterial phyla (Ciccarelli et al., 2006)
Branching order of bacterial phyla (Genome Taxonomy Database, 2018)
Branching order of bacterial phyla after ARB Silva Living Tree